Several ships have been named Barton:

 was a Liverpool-based West Indiaman that  captured and burned on 28 May 1814
 was a Liverpool-based slave ship that the French captured late in her second slave trading voyage
 was a Liverpool-based West Indiaman that wrecked in 1836 and was last listed in 1837.
 was based at Hull, traded with the West Indies and India, and was lost in 1823 off Jutland.

See also
 - one of two vessels of that name that served in the United States Navy

Ship names